The boys' 3000 metres speed skating competition of the Innsbruck 2012 Winter Youth Olympics was held at Eisschnellaufbahn on 18 January 2012.

Results
The races were held at 12:19.

References

External links 
 olympedia.org
 

Speed skating at the 2012 Winter Youth Olympics